Nepal Engineers' Association (NEA) (Nepali:नेपाल ईन्जिनियर्स एसोसियसन) is an independent non-profit organization of engineers of Nepal. Its headquarters is located in Pulchowk, Lalitpur. It was established in 1962. It has the provincial committee in each province of Nepal.

Objectives
It has the following objectives:
 promote the development of the engineering science and technology
 promote fellowship and safeguard their rights and interests of engineers
 enhance participation of the national engineering manpower for national development activities 
 develop relations, fellowship and goodwill with international engineering associations and institutions.

Activities
 NEA celebrates its annual Engineers' day on Shrawan 3. 
 Veteran engineers are facilitated with lifetime achievement award and young and upcoming fellow engineers are recognized within the event. Apart for annual event NEA also holds international conventions every two years.
 Training and rapid response in disaster management

Members
Year 2022: 36,500 plus numbers

International centers
 NEA Qatar, established 2004
 Australia
 Thailand
 United Kingdom
 Japan

External links
Official website

See also
Nepal Engineering Council

References

Scientific organisations based in Nepal
Professional associations based in Nepal
1962 establishments in Nepal
Engineering organizations in Nepal